Horst Urban (15 May 1936 – 2 March 2010) was a Czech luger. He competed at the 1964 Winter Olympics and the 1968 Winter Olympics.

References

1936 births
2010 deaths
Czech male lugers
Olympic lugers of Czechoslovakia
Lugers at the 1964 Winter Olympics
Lugers at the 1968 Winter Olympics
Sportspeople from Jablonec nad Nisou